Scissuralaelaps is a genus of mites in the family Laelapidae.

Species
 Scissuralaelaps bipartitus Ishikawa, 1988     
 Scissuralaelaps breviseta Ishikawa, 1988     
 Scissuralaelaps grootaerti Fain, 1992     
 Scissuralaelaps hirschmanni Fain, 1992     
Scissuralaelaps huberi Seeman & Alberti, 2015
 Scissuralaelaps innotensis Halliday, 1993     
 Scissuralaelaps irianensis Fain, 1992     
 Scissuralaelaps joliveti Fain, 1992     
 Scissuralaelaps novaguinea Womersley, 1945     
 Scissuralaelaps philippinensis Rosario, 1981     
 Scissuralaelaps queenslandica Womersley, 1945

References

Laelapidae